Walls Crossing is an unincorporated community in Schley County, in the U.S. state of Georgia.

History
The community was named after Henry Wall, the proprietor of a local cotton gin.

References

Unincorporated communities in Georgia (U.S. state)
Unincorporated communities in Schley County, Georgia